Sandra Ann King is an American film producer and businesswoman who is known for In the Mouth of Madness, Village of the Damned, Vampires, and Ghosts of Mars, all of which were directed by her husband John Carpenter.

Sandy is the co-founder and chief executive officer of Storm King Productions and its division Storm King Comics. She co-created the comic book series Asylum, in which Carpenter is also involved.

Early life and family 
Born in Los Angeles, California, she went to University of California, Los Angeles, College of Fine Arts, and received a bachelor's degree in pictorial arts in 1973.

She has been married to American filmmaker John Carpenter since 1990.

Career 
Sandy has a background in art and animation and has worked in various films as a producer and director.

Comics 
 John Carpenter Presents Storm Kids
 John Carpenter's Asylum
 John Carpenter's Night Terrors
 John Carpenter's Tales for a Halloween Night
 John Carpenter's Tales of Science Fiction

Filmography 
 In the Mouth of Madness (1994)
 Village of the Damned (1995)
 Vampires (1998)
 Ghosts of Mars (2001)

References 

Living people
1952 births
American film producers
American women film producers